Executive federalism is "the processes of intergovernmental negotiation that are dominated by the executives of the different governments within the federal system." Alternatively, Donald Smiley defined Executive federalism  as “the relation between elected and appointed officials of the two orders of government.”

Canada 

In Canada, the most publicized aspect of Executive federalism is the First Ministers Conference; however, in the first decade of the 21st century, the Council of the Federation became the important bi-annual meeting between the Premiers of Canada. Notable efforts at the Council of the Federation include the attempt by former Premier of Ontario, Mike Harris, to promote the idea that the provinces should take primary responsibility to set the national standards in social policy  and Premier of Alberta, Ralph Klein, calling on other premiers to join him in opposing Ottawa's signing of the Kyoto protocol.

Australia

During the COVID-19 pandemic in Australia, the National Cabinet, consisting of the Prime Minister and the premiers and chief ministers of the Australian states and territories, in order to help guide the country through the crisis. It has been described as akin to Australia's war cabinet during the Second World War. As a special intergovernmental decision-making forum, its power is that which the leaders of all Australian jurisdictions bring to negotiate on behalf of their people, and to implement the decisions reached, a model which public policy expert Jennifer Menzies calls executive federalism. In this model, the citizens of each state or territory are represented by their elected heads, and the smaller states have equal representation

References 

Federalism